Shilji Shaji (born 13 March 2007) is an Indian women's international footballer who plays for Gokulam Kerala and the India U17.

Career

Gokulam Kerala

International career 
Shilji scored her first goal For India U17 Team in a Friendly match against  on 6 February 2023.  shilji scored four goals in the match.Shilji scored four goals in the next match also against the same opponent on 9 february 2023..Shilji Shaji scored a hat trick as India beat  emphatically in the 2023 SAFF U-17 Women's Championship.

Honours

References

External links 

2007 births
Living people
People from Salem, Tamil Nadu
Footballers from Kerala
Sportswomen from Kerala
Indian women's footballers
India women's international footballers
India women's youth international footballers
Gokulam Kerala FC Women players